Robert Phelps (1926–2013) was an American mathematician

Robert Phelps may also refer to:
 Robert Phelps (academic) (1808–1890), British academic
 Robert Phelps (wrestler) (1890–?), British wrestler
 Robert Phelps (pentathlete) (born 1939), British modern pentathlete